The 2007 Iowa Hawkeyes football team represented the University of Iowa during the 2007 NCAA Division I FBS football season. Heading into the season, several players left the team while several other players ran into criminal allegations. Following a disappointing 2006 season that included losses to Indiana, Northwestern and Minnesota, the team was coached by Kirk Ferentz and played their six home games at Kinnick Stadium in Iowa City, Iowa.

Previous season

Entering 2006 ranked 16th in the AP Poll and 17th in the Coaches Poll, the Hawkeyes had high hopes for the season. Following victories over Montana, Syracuse, Iowa State and Illinois, the Hawkeyes were 4–0 heading into their game with top-ranked Ohio State. With tickets for the game going for US$500 on eBay, the game was hyped as one of the biggest in Kinnick Stadium history. But quarterback Drew Tate threw 3 interceptions, and the Hawkeyes lost 38–17. In total, Iowa had 4 turnovers while Ohio State had zero.

Following the loss to Ohio State, Iowa proceeded to score a season-high 47 points in a victory over Purdue. But the most notable score came during the 4th quarter, when Adam Shada intercepted a Curtis Painter pass and returned it a school record 98-yards for the touchdown. However, Iowa's joy would not last long, as the Hawkeyes were upset by Indiana only a week later. The 31–28 win was Indiana's biggest win since a victory over 9th-ranked Ohio State in 1987.

From there, the season unraveled, and the Hawkeyes lost four of their remaining five games en route to a 6–6 record.  The Hawkeyes were not invited to a bowl game following the conclusion of the 2007 season.

Before the season
On April 20, 2007, it was announced by Ferentz that two players, Ryan Bain and Justin Edwards, were leaving the team. Both are planning on transferring to other schools. Bain, who had 56 career tackles, was later found guilty on charges of disorderly conduct. About two months later, it was announced that Shonn Greene and Amari Spievey were no longer on the team. Greene, a junior running back, had 378 rushing yards and two touchdowns in his career. Another month later, and it was announced that Lucas Cox and Marcus Wilson were leaving the team. Wilson, a sophomore defensive back, played in all 13 games in 2006 and recorded 21 tackles and one interception. Earlier in July, senior defensive back Devan Moylan was given an additional year of eligibility. After suffering a leg injury in the fourth game of 2006 against Illinois, he applied for a medical hardship. Prior to the 2007 season, he had 28 tackles and one interception in his career.

Criminal charges
On August 20, 2007, two Hawkeye wide receivers were arrested and charged with the unauthorized use of a credit card. Dominique Douglas and Anthony Bowman, both sophomores,  were suspended indefinitely by Ferentz following allegations that they bought more than $2,000 in merchandise with stolen credit cards. The crime is a felony, and if convicted, the two players can face up to five years in prison along with a $7,500 fine. Another player, Arvell Nelson, also experienced trouble with the law. Nelson posted a $545 bond for failure to appear in court after being charged with driving with a suspended license. He also paid a $390 fine for not having insurance. 1 in every 10 Iowa football players during the 2007 season had off-field arrests, the highest among any year in Kirk Ferentz's tenure at Iowa.

Recruiting class
The Hawkeyes received 22 letters of intent on National Signing Day, February 7, 2007.

Awards

 Kenny Iwebema
First-team all-Big Ten – Rivals.com
First-team all-Big Ten – CFN.com
 Mitch King
First-team all-Big Ten – Rivals.com
Second-team all-Big Ten – Athlon Sports
 Bryan Mattison
First-team all-Big Ten – Athlon Sports
Second-team all-Big Ten – Rivals.com
Second-team all-Big Ten – CFN.com
 Mike Klinkenborg
Lott Trophy watch list
Bednarik Award watch list
Second-team all-Big Ten – Rivals.com
Second-team all-Big Ten – CFN.com
Second-team all-Big Ten – Athlon Sports
 Tony Moeaki
Mackey Award watch list
 Albert Young
Second-team all-Big Ten – CFN.com
Second-team all-Big Ten – Athlon Sports
 Dace Richardson
Second-team all-Big Ten – Rivals.com
Second-team all-Big Ten – Athlon Sports
 Matt Kroul
Second-team all-Big Ten – Athlon Sports
 Adam Shada
Third-team all-Big Ten – Athlon Sports
 Rafael Eubanks
Rimington Trophy watch list
Second-team all-Big Ten – Athlon Sports
 Seth Olsen
Third-team all-Big Ten – Athlon Sports

Schedule

Schedule notes
Due to the Big Ten's rotating schedule, Iowa did not play either Michigan or Ohio State in 2007. Instead, Iowa played Michigan State and Penn State, two teams that the Hawkeyes had not played since 2004.

Iowa's schedule was ranked as the 9th toughest (or 3rd easiest) in the Big Ten by SI.com.

Roster

Coaches

Game summaries

Northern Illinois

Playing in Soldier Field in Chicago, the Hawkeyes defeated the Northern Illinois Huskies 16–3. Albert Young ran for 144 yards and a touchdown as Iowa's defense kept the Huskies from scoring a touchdown. Damian Sims also made his mark by running for 110 yards. The Hawkeyes held Northern Illinois to 21 yards rushing, and Charles Godfrey intercepted two Dan Nicholson passes. Sophomore quarterback Jake Christensen opened the season with 133 yards and one touchdown.

Syracuse

Behind a strong defensive performance, the Hawkeyes shut out the Syracuse Orange at Kinnick Stadium. Rebounding from a shaky performance against Northern Illinois, Christensen threw for 278 yards and four touchdowns, three of them to tight end Tony Moeaki. On special teams, Kenny Iwebema blocked two field goals to help preserve the worst loss for Syracuse coach Greg Robinson in his tenure with the Orange. After the game, Syracuse running back Curtis Brinkley said:

The 35-point loss was Syracuse's most-lopsided since a 51–14 loss to Georgia Tech in the 2004 Champs Sports Bowl.

Iowa State

Source: ESPN
    
    
    
    
    
    
    
    

Iowa State kicked its way to a 15–13 victory in Ames.

Wisconsin

Iowa's defense forced three Wisconsin turnovers, but could not hold off the Badgers' 4th quarter rally, losing 17–13.

Indiana

Iowa was unable to contain a scoring explosion from Indiana, including three early touchdowns by Hoosier quarterback Kellen Lewis. Iowa added to its difficulties with penalties and breakdowns in pass protection. Although quarterback Jake Christensen passed for 308 yards and three touchdowns, he was sacked nine times, including four by Jammie Kirlew. The Hawkeyes also missed two field goals and an extra point.

Penn State

Quarterback Jake Christensen was sacked twice, and the Hawkeyes were held scoreless until an interception near the Penn State end zone set up Trey Stross' 4th-quarter touchdown reception in a 27–7 blowout loss on the road at Penn State. Iowa was held to eight first downs while Penn State had 26.

Illinois

Entering the game, Iowa had lost eight straight Big Ten games, with their last win a 47–17 decision over Purdue on October 7, 2006. Illinois, however, entered the game ranked 18th in the country, and was looking to become bowl eligible with a win over the Hawkeyes.

From the very beginning, the game was a defensive one. The Hawkeyes held Illinois running back Rashard Mendenhall to 67 yards, and slowed the nation's fifth-best rushing offense to 137 yards total. But the Illinois defense remained strong against the run, and held the Hawkeyes to a three yards per rush average.

Illinois did not trail until late in the third quarter, when Iowa quarterback Jake Christensen found tight end Brandon Myers down the middle for the touchdown. With the score at 10–6 in favor of the Hawkeyes, the Illini made a switch to Eddie McGee at quarterback, after starter Isiah Williams had a fumble recovered by Iowa. With McGee in, the Illini appeared to have stunned the Kinnick Stadium crowd with an 83-yard touchdown pass, but it was called back due to an Illinois penalty.

Despite the penalty, Illinois was not done. On Illinois' final drive, McGee drove the Illini down to the Iowa 12 with passes of 28 and 24 yards to Arrelious Benn. But with 1:12 left in the game, a McGee pass was intercepted at the goal line by Iowa's Brett Greenwood. The win was Iowa's first over a ranked team since 2005.

Purdue

Michigan State

Northwestern

Minnesota

Western Michigan

Mid-American Conference member Western Michigan surprised the Hawkeyes, 28–19, in Iowa City.

Team players in the 2008 NFL draft

References

Iowa
Iowa Hawkeyes football seasons
Iowa Hawkeyes football